Tonyrefail is a village and community in the Rhondda Cynon Taf County Borough, Wales. During the second half of the 19th century, when coal and steel became synonymous with the South Wales Valleys, Tonyrefail evolved from being a rural hamlet to an industrial village. The population at the 2001 census was 11,035.

Toponymy 
Tonyrefail derives from the Welsh Ton yr Efail meaning the forge on the meadow (lea). From ton, meaning lea or grassland and efail meaning forge.

History 
Tonyrefail was a dairy farming and livestock raising area, and many early farmhouses still exist today. This was in stark contrast to the nearby valleys, that were forced to adopt arable and sheep farming activities due to their hilly geography. Early industrialisation began in the late 18th century around a corn mill and woollen factory, but it wasn't until deep coal mining began that employment grew on a large scale. At its peak Coedely Colliery employed nearly 1,800 men which not only changed the face of Tonyrefail, but also created the establishment of nearby colliery settlements such as Coedely and Bryngolau. It was once a busy town in its own right as well as serving the communities of Coedely, Trebanog and Gilfach Goch.

It is widely believed that King Edward II was captured by forces loyal to Queen Isabella near Tonyrefail in 1326.

Governance
At the lowest tier of local government, Tonyrefail elects a community council, Tonyrefail & District Community Council. The community is divided into six community electoral wards: Coedely, Collenna, Penrhiwfer, Thomastown, Tylcha and Tyn-y-Bryn.

The community of Tonyrefail is divided into two county borough wards, Tonyrefail East and Tonyrefail West, for elections to Rhondda Cynon Taf County Borough Council.

Buildings of note 
One of the most notable buildings in Tonyrefail is Collenna House, a three-story mansion originally built in 1093, which overlooks the village.  The house is believed to have been built by the Welsh noble, Einion ap Collwyn who after a dispute with Iestyn ab Gwrgant, married Iestyn's only daughter, Nest. The two are said to have set up home at Collenna House and it was around this time that they founded the old church of St. John. Collenna House would eventually become home to the Prichard family, who trace their line back to the house's original Norman occupants. One of the more notable members of the Prichard family, who would eventually die at Collenna house, was Reverend Richard Prichard, Vicar of Llandaff. His son, John Prichard was a renowned Welsh architect who was responsible for restoration work at Llandaff Cathedral and many other local churches. To the southwest is Mynydd Maendy, a hill top which contains a wind farm; the admin offices are situated in Tonyrefail. During May 2013 the listed Savoy Theatre, situated on Collenna Road, received permission from Rhondda Cynon Taff County Borough Council's Development Control Committee to re-open, having been closed for some 10 years before.

Notable people 
See :Category:People from Tonyrefail
Alex Davies-Jones, Labour MP for Pontypridd.
Dick Hellings, Collier, forward for Llwynypia RFC, international forward for Wales (1898-1901) who helped secure their Triple Crown win (1900).
Jeffrey John, Church of England priest and first openly gay bishop-designate.
Matthew Rees, Wales and British Lions international rugby union player.
Vaughan Jones, footballer

External links 
 Tonyrefail & District Community Council Website
 www.geograph.co.uk : photos of Tonyrefail and surrounding area
 Welsh Coal Mines website
 Tonyrefail Rugby Club website

Bibliography

References 

Villages in Rhondda Cynon Taf
Communities in Rhondda Cynon Taf